Karl Mickel (12 August 1935 – 20 June 2000) was a German writer.

Life 
Mickel was born in Dresden into a working-class family. There, he attended primary school from 1941 to 1949 and experienced together with his mother the bombing of Dresden in February 1945. The pictures of the following days never left him. From 1949 to 1953, he also attended secondary school in Dresden. He finished with the Abitur and was admitted to study in Berlin.

In 1958, he was an employee of the magazine Die Wirtschaft, and from 1959 to 1963 editor of the magazine Junge Kunst. Afterwards, he was a scientific assistant at the Hochschule für Ökonomie in Berlin and a member of the management of the Berliner Ensemble, where he worked together with Ruth Berghaus, lastly professor at the Ernst Busch Academy of Dramatic Arts in Berlin. Mickel had two children with his wife, furthermore, his relationship with the poet Sarah Kirsch gave a son.

Mickel worked from 1959 to 1964 as IM "Michael" and from 1987 to 1989 as IMS "Bert" for the eastgerman Stasi.

Mickel died in Berlin at the age of 64.

Work 
Poetry and prose
Lobverse und Beschimpfungen. Poetry.  1963
Vita nova mea.  1966
Eisenzeit. Poetry. Mitteldeutscher Verlag, 1975
Eisenzeit. Poetry. 1981. 
Odysseus in Ithaka. Poetry
Palimpsest. Gedichte und Kommentare 1975–1989. Mitteldeutscher Verlag 1990. 
Lachmunds Freunde. Novel
Erstes Buch. Mitteldeutscher Verlag 1991. 
Erstes (vom Autor revidierte Fassung) und Zweites Buch (unvollendet). Wallstein 2006
 Die Jahre.

Aus der Anderwelt. Erzählungen. Verlag Ulrich Keicher, 1998. 
Gelehrtenrepublik. Aufsätze und Studien von Klopstock bis Papenfuß. Mitteldeutscher Verlag 2000. 
Der Besuch. Lyrik und Texte aus dem Nachlaß. Verlag UN ART IG 2003. 
Geisterstunde. poetry, private impression, 1999. New edition: Wallstein Verlag, 2004. 

Plays and libretti
Die Einverstandenen. Revue. Music Günter Kochan. UA 1958
Requiem für Patrice Lumumba. Cantata. Music: Paul Dessau. UA 1964
Nausikaa. Drama. Premiere 1968
Einstein. Opera, music Paul Dessau. Premiere 1974
Celestina. Tragicomedy after Fernando de Rojas. Premiere 1975 Berliner Ensemble
Bettina. Opera, Music (1982): Friedrich Schenker. Premiere 1987 Berlin (with Annette Jahns)
Gefährliche Liebschaften oder Der kalte Krieg. Opera seria. Musik (1993): Friedrich Schenker. Premiere 1997 Ulm
Volks Entscheid. Pieces. 1987
Halsgericht. Comedy after Apuleius). Mitteldeutscher Verlag 1994. 
Kants Affe. Ein Todtengespräch – Immanuel Kant / de Sade. Mit Grafiken von Nuria Quevedo. Edition Balance, 1994
Goldberg-Passion. Music (1998/99): Friedrich Schenker. Premiere 9 November 1999 in Leipzig

Editor
 In diesem besseren Land (with Adolf Endler). Halle 1966
  (with Christoph Buchwald). Darmstadt 1990

Audiobook
 in Dichtung des 20. Jahrhunderts: Meine 24 sächsischen Dichter, edited by Gerhard Pötzsch,  2 CDs,  Militzke Verlag Leipzig 2009,

Honours 
 1978: Heinrich-Mann-Preis
 1997:  des Landes Sachsen-Anhalt
 1998: Christian-Wagner-Preis

References

Further reading 
 Leon Hempel: Stillstand und Bewegung. Hoher Stil in der Lyrik Ost- und Westdeutschlands. GegenSatz Verlag, Berlin 2011,

External links 

 
 

20th-century German writers
German librettists
Members of the Academy of Arts, Berlin
1935 births
2000 deaths
Writers from Dresden